Two leadership elections were held in the UK Independence Party in 2016:

July–September 2016 UK Independence Party leadership election
October–November 2016 UK Independence Party leadership election